The Austrian Attack variation of the Pirc Defence is a chess opening characterised by the following moves:

1. e4 d6
2. d4 Nf6
3. Nc3 g6
4. f4 Bg7

Typical continuations include the  5.Nf3 0-0, an immediate  attack with 5.e5 Nfd7, or a  counterattack with 5.Nf3 c5.

The Pirc Defence is one of several hypermodern responses to the opening move 1.e4. The aim of the Austrian Attack is to take advantage of Black's hypermodern approach by establishing a broad pawn centre early in the game. The general strategy for White is to use the pawn on f4 to support a breakthrough with e4–e5.

Performance 
The Chessgames.com master game database records approximately 1850 games which opened with the Austrian Attack. Of those games, White won 39.4%, Black won 28%, and the remaining 32.6% were draws. Siegbert Tarrasch successfully employed the Austrian Attack against Rudolf Charousek in 1896, securing a win in just 17 moves. Edward Lasker unsuccessfully used the opening against Miguel Najdorf, resigning after 42 moves. In 1952, Isaac Boleslavsky tried the opening against Vasja Pirc (after whom the Pirc Defence is named), but they agreed to a draw after move 62.

In the 17th game of the 1972 World Chess Championship, Boris Spassky opened with 1.e4. Bobby Fischer responded with the Pirc Defence, for the only time in his career. Spassky played the Austrian Attack. The game proceeded as follows:
1.e4 d6 2.d4 g6 3.Nc3 Nf6 4.f4 Bg7 5.Nf3 c5 6.dxc5 Qa5 7.Bd3 Qxc5 8.Qe2 0-0 9.Be3 Qa5 10.0-0 Bg4 11.Rad1 Nc6 12.Bc4 Nh5 13.Bb3 Bxc3 14.bxc3 Qxc3 15.f5 Nf6 16.h3 Bxf3 17.Qxf3 Na5 18.Rd3 Qc7 19.Bh6 Nxb3 20.cxb3 Qc5+ 21.Kh1 (see diagram) Qe5

By playing 21...Qe5 instead of 21...Rf8–c8, Fischer offered the exchange sacrifice as a means of blunting Spassky's kingside attack. The game ended on move 45 owing to draw by agreement despite Spassky having a slight material advantage.

References 

Bibliography

Chess openings